John Nocera was a professional American football player who played linebacker for five seasons for the Philadelphia Eagles and Denver Broncos.

References

1934 births
1981 deaths
American football linebackers
Philadelphia Eagles players
Players of American football from Youngstown, Ohio
Denver Broncos (AFL) players
Iowa Hawkeyes football players